Al-Sabkhah Subdistrict or Al-Sabkhah Nahiyah  is a Syrian Nahiyah (Subdistrict) located in Raqqa District in Raqqa.  According to the Syria Central Bureau of Statistics (CBS), Al-Sabkhah Subdistrict had a population of 48,106 in the 2004 census.

References 

Subdistricts of Raqqa Governorate